Born Ruffians are a Canadian indie rock band based in Toronto. Officially founded in 2004 in the  Georgian Bay town of Midland, Ontario, the band is composed of frontman Luke Lalonde, bassist Mitch DeRosier, and drummer Steve Hamelin. During the 2010s, they were also joined by Andy Lloyd (guitar/keyboards) and Adam Hindle (drums). Born Ruffians released their debut album Red, Yellow & Blue in 2008, and have since released seven albums in total, including their two most recents records, Juice and Squeeze, both released in 2020.

History

2000s: Formation and debut records 
Born Ruffians originally formed in 2002 under the name Mornington Drive, and self-released an album called Makeshift Metric Catastrophe. In an interview, DeRosier described it as entirely homemade: "It was burned onto CD in Steve's basement, the packaging was sewn by Steve's mom and I think Luke painted the covers."

After renaming themselves Born Ruffians, the band moved from Midland to Toronto in 2004. After some local performances and a growing online reputation, the band was signed to the UK electronic music label Warp Records. They released their self-titled debut EP in 2006. It was recorded by Ryan Mills at Little King Studio (now Sleepytown Sound). They received extensive airplay on CBC Radio 3 with their debut single, "This Sentence Will Ruin/Save Your Life," as well as a cover of Grizzly Bear's single "Knife" which the band recorded live on KEXP. 

In 2007, they released the single "Hummingbird," which was included on their first album Red, Yellow & Blue. Born Ruffians' Red, Yellow & Blue was nominated in the 8th Annual Independent Music Awards for Pop/Rock Album of the year.

In 2009, they recorded a cover of two Aphex Twin songs for Warp20 (Recreated), a compilation. 

They appeared in an episode of the second season of British teen drama Skins, playing their song "Hummingbird" in a night club. The song is also featured in a television advert in the UK for Orange mobile telecommunications' "Animal" campaign. "Hummingbird" is also featured in a car advertisement in Australia. The band was featured in episode seven of the comedic web series, Nirvana the Band the Show, playing as themselves as they rehearse with a new member of the band. On July 31, 2009 the Born Ruffians played for Nirvana the Band at The Rivoli for the wrap of their web-series. Footage of this show will be included in episode ten.

First tours

They toured with Franz Ferdinand, Caribou, Peter Bjorn and John, Hot Chip, The Hidden Cameras, Tokyo Police Club (with whom they have also performed songs on stage) and The Honorary Title. They toured Canada (mostly Ontario) throughout April 2008, completing the North American leg of their tour on April 26, 2008, with an album release party at Lee's Palace in Toronto. In May and June 2008, they finished their UK tour and continued touring throughout Europe.

They toured Australia in January and February 2009 as part of St Jerome's Laneway Festival along with Girl Talk, Stereolab, Architecture In Helsinki, The Hold Steady, The Drones, Cut Off Your Hands, Four Tet, Tame Impala, El Guincho, Jay Reatard, Buraka Som Sistema Dj/Mc Set, The Temper Trap, No Age and more.

2010s 
The band's second album, entitled Say It, was released June 1, 2010. The album was recorded at Metalworks Studios in Toronto and mastered at Rusty Santos' studio in Brooklyn. The first single from it was "What To Say" followed by "Nova Leigh" and "Oh Man".

In April 2011, their single "Little Garçon" appeared in an American Express commercial, Real Tweets, which included edited versions of tweets from @activecultures and others.

The band's 2013 album, Birthmarks, was released on April 16 via Paper Bag Records. The band spent roughly three years writing all over the world including several months spent living together in an old farmhouse in rural Ontario. The album was recorded at BoomBox Sound with producer/engineer Roger Leavens and engineer Marcel Ramagnano. Following the record, drummer Hamelin took leave of the band to pursue a degree in history and international relations. Drummer Adam Hindle officially joined the band during the second tour to support Birthmarks.

Lalonde revealed in an interview with Revue Magazine that he has been working on an acoustic Born Ruffians EP since the summer after Birthmarks was released. This acoustic EP was released on the band's website, available for free download. A total of nine tracks were released.

On October 2, 2015, the band released their fourth studio album, RUFF. The band fluctuated between a trio and quartet in the following year, with drummer Hamelin rejoining the band and guitarist Andy Lloyd later leaving, following the birth of his daughter.

Born Ruffians released their fifth studio album Uncle, Duke & The Chief in February 2018. The album was the final record produced by acclaimed musician Richard Swift.

In 2020, the band released two studio albums, JUICE, its companion SQUEEZE and as the last part of the 'trilogy' PULP in 2021.

Band members 

 Luke Lalonde – vocals, guitar, keyboards (2002–present)
 Mitch DeRosier – bass guitar (2002–present)
 Steve Hamelin – drums (2002–2009, 2009–2014, 2016–present)

Former

 Andy Lloyd – guitar, keyboards (2010–2016)
 Adam Hindle – drums (2014–2017)

Discography

Studio albums

EPs

Singles

See also 

List of bands from Canada
Rock music of Canada

References

External links
 Born Ruffians
 Interview with Born Ruffians on artistxite

Musical groups established in 2004
Canadian indie rock groups
Musical groups from Toronto
Warp (record label) artists
Paper Bag Records artists
Musical quartets
2004 establishments in Ontario